David Nazim (born 7 November 1996) is a Nigerian professional footballer who plays as a midfielder for Greek Super League 2 club Chania.

References

External links

1996 births
Living people
Sportspeople from Onitsha
Association football midfielders
Nigerian footballers
A.P.S. Zakynthos players
PAE Kerkyra players
NK Ankaran players
Panserraikos F.C. players
Apollon Larissa F.C. players
A.E. Karaiskakis F.C. players
AO Chania F.C. players
Super League Greece 2 players
Nigerian expatriate footballers
Nigerian expatriate sportspeople in Greece
Expatriate footballers in Greece
Nigerian expatriate sportspeople in Slovenia
Expatriate footballers in Slovenia
Slovenian PrvaLiga players
Football League (Greece) players